Cumia reticulata, common name the false triton, is a species of sea snail, a marine gastropod mollusk in the family Colubrariidae. In this family, there are at least 6 species that are known to feed on blood. The trait of feeding on blood is likely shared by the entire family. 

It is commonly known as the vampire snail because it feeds on the blood of fish when they are asleep. Colubraria reticulata are commonly found in rocky and coral environments that are tropical or subtropical and temperate seas. They are found in the benthic zone, which is the ecological region at the lowest level of a body of water.

Description
Members of the Neogastropoda are mostly gonochoric and broadcast spawners. The lifecycle of these snails start off as embryos that develop into planktonic trochophore larvae. After the larval stage, they evolve into juvenile veligers before becoming fully grown adults. The length of the shell varies between 10 mm and 64 mm.

Distribution
The type locality is Sicily. It also occurs off West Africa. They are also located in the Southwest Mediterranean Sea and are not considered as widely dispersed species.

Feeding habits
The vampire snail feeds at night when fishes are asleep. Their modified mouthpart can slice flesh like tiny scalpels. At the end of their mouth is a mounted proboscis. These snails possess a long thin proboscis to feed on the blood of fish. Once contact is made between the proboscis and the skin of the fish, the proboscis extends its length to gain access to the blood vessel. Their proboscis can stretch 3 times its body length and allows them to bypass many fishes defenses to blood sucking. An example would be the Parrot fish's mucus sleeping bag.

Secretion of Bioactive Molecules
Upon contact with the skin, anesthetic is secreted to numb the area. Colubraria reticulata  secretes chemicals that disrupts the process of blood clotting and wound healing. Common anesthetics from protein families ShK, Turripeptide, ADA, and CAP-ShK were found to be present during hematophagy. In addition, anticoagulants such as PS1, Meprin, and Kunitz were also present to prevent blood clotting. The anticoagulants are active until the blood is fully digested. These snails have secondary glands in the oesophagus that secrete proteins to keep the blood liquified in their guts. Furthermore, vasopressives were found and because the proboscis is thin, it is hypothesized for vasopressives to increase blood pressure to allow maximization of blood income and feeding time. This is significant because the snail's proboscis is not very muscular so without vasopressive compounds, they cannot suck blood efficiently. 

Turritoxin which is unique to the vampire snail, is also produced by coneshell. Although the function of turritoxin is specifically unknown to the vampire snail, scientists have looked towards coneshell and hypothesized that the use of turritoxin is of the same manner.

References

 Gofas, S.; Le Renard, J.; Bouchet, P. (2001). Mollusca. in: Costello, M.J. et al. (eds), European Register of Marine Species: a check-list of the marine species in Europe and a bibliography of guides to their identification. Patrimoines Naturels. 50: 180-213
 Bernard, P.A. (Ed.) (1984). Coquillages du Gabon [Shells of Gabon]. Pierre A. Bernard: Libreville, Gabon. 140, 75 plates pp.
 Ardovini R. (2014) Istituzione di una nuova varietà appartenente alla famiglia Colubrariidae Dall, 1904 nel Mediterraneo e revisione sistematica. Malacologia Mostra Mondiale 82: 6-8
Leung, T. (1970, January 1). Colubraria reticulata. Retrieved from http://dailyparasite.blogspot.com/2015/11/colubraria-reticulata.html
Modica, M. V., Lombardo, F., Franchini, P., & Oliverio, M. (2015). The venomous cocktail of the vampire snail Colubraria reticulata (Mollusca, Gastropoda). BMC Genomics, 16(1). doi: 10.1186/s12864-015-1648-4
Sealifebase.ca. (2019). Cumia reticulata. [online] Available at: https://www.sealifebase.ca/summary/Cumia-reticulata.html

Further reading
 Deshayes, G. P., 1835. Mollusques. Pp. 81-203, pl. 18-26, in Bory de Saint-Vincent J.B.G.M. (ed.), Expédition scientifique de Morée. Section des Sciences Physiques. Tome III. 1ere Partie. Zoologie. Première Section. Animaux vertébrés, Mollusques et Polypiers. Levrault, Paris
 Bivona-Bernardi And., 1838. Generi e specie di molluschi descritti dal Barone Antonio Bivona e Bernardi. Lavori postumi pubblicati dal figlio Andrea dottore in medicina con note ed aggiunte. Giornale di Scienze Lettere e Arti per la Sicilia 61: 211-227 [stated date march 1838]; 63: 319-324

External links

 
 Helbling G. S. (1779). Beyträge zur Kenntniß neuer und seltener Konchylien. Aus einigen Wienerischen Sammlungen. Abhandlungen einer Privatgesellschaft in Böhmen, zur Aufnahme der Mathematik, der vaterländischen Geschichte, und der Naturgeschichte, 4: 102-131, pl. 1-4
 Brusina S. (1870). Ipsa Chiereghinii Conchylia ovvero contribuzione pella malacologia adriatica. Pisa, Biblioteca Malacologica pp. 280
 Sowerby, G. B. I & Sowerby, G. B. II. (1832-1841). The conchological illustrations or, Coloured figures of all the hitherto unfigured recent shells. London, privately published
 Blainville H. M. (D. de) (1828-1830). Malacozoaires ou Animaux Mollusques. in Faune Française. Levrault, Paris 320 p., 48 pl. [livr. 18 (1828), p. 1-80; livr. 2 (1829), p. 81-176; livr. 23 (1829), p. 177-240; livr. 28 (1830), p. 241-320
 Delle Chiaje S. (1823-1831). Memorie sulla storia e notomia degli animali senza vertebre del regno di Napoli. Napoli: Fratelli Fernandes (vol. 1), and Società Tipografica (vol. 2-4). 
 Monterosato, T. A. (1880). Notizie intorno ad alcune conchiglie delle coste d'Africa. Bullettino della Società Malacologica Italiana, Pisa. 5: 213-233

Colubrariidae
Gastropods described in 1829